Kaukab Stewart (born 1967/68 ) is a Scottish National Party (SNP) politician who has been the Member of the Scottish Parliament (MSP) for Glasgow Kelvin since May 2021.

At the 2021 Scottish Parliament election, she became one of the first women of colour elected to the Scottish Parliament, alongside Pam Gosal.

Early life and career
Stewart was born in Pakistan and moved with her family to Northampton, England when she was five years old, where she attended Northampton School for Girls. She then moved to Glasgow, Scotland, aged sixteen and attended Bellahouston Academy in Glasgow and Moray House School of Education in Edinburgh.

Prior to her election, she worked as a primary school teacher for nearly 30 years, alongside pursuing a political career, which she earlier admitted as challenging even with a "sympathetic headteacher....you have a duty to the kids, who must come first."

She married Richard Stewart on 14 September 1989. They have two children.

Political career
Stewart joined the Scottish National Party in 1994. "For me it is all about the fact that I was always a supporter of equal rights and self-determination," she explained. "I always wanted control over my own affairs and it was a natural progression to put that into a Scotland context. To be able to do what you want to do, when you want to do it and how you want to do it is very important to me."

She stood unsuccessfully as a SNP candidate in the first Scottish Parliament election since devolution, against Donald Dewar for Glasgow Anniesland at the 1999 Scottish Parliament election. Eleven years later, she stood unsuccessfully against former Chancellor of the Exchequer Alistair Darling at the 2010 general election. Speaking about these experiences in September 2020, Stewart said: "In these elections I knew my chances of being elected were close to zero but it was that dream of a better nation which inspired me to carry on... It's thanks to the hard work of the activists I worked with then that we are where we are today."

On 6 November 2020, Stewart was selected as the SNP candidate in Glasgow Kelvin for the 2021 Scottish Parliament election. At the election, she was elected as Kelvin's Member of the Scottish Parliament (MSP) with a majority of 5,458 votes. Her election was noted in the UK press and abroad, such as The Japan Times and Le Parisien.

Stewart was appointed in June 2021 as deputy convenor of the Holyrood education committee which scrutinises Scottish education policy and its lead bodies.

She was interviewed for Channel 4 blog The Political Slot on her party's vision for equality in Scotland.

See also
 List of British Pakistanis
 List of ethnic minority politicians in the United Kingdom

References

External links 
 
 Personal website

Year of birth missing (living people)
Place of birth missing (living people)
Living people
Scottish National Party MSPs
Members of the Scottish Parliament 2021–2026
Members of the Scottish Parliament for Glasgow constituencies
Female members of the Scottish Parliament
British politicians of Pakistani descent
Scottish people of Pakistani descent
Scottish Muslims
Scottish schoolteachers
People educated at Bellahouston Academy
Pakistani emigrants to England